William John Miller II (born September 17, 1979) is an American actor.  He is best known for his soap opera roles as Billy Abbott on CBS' The Young and the Restless, and Jason Morgan and Drew Cain on ABC's General Hospital.

Early life and education 
Miller was born in Tulsa, Oklahoma, and grew up in Grand Prairie, Texas.  As a child, Miller spent five years as a patient of Texas Scottish Rite Hospital for Children, an organization he now supports.

He attended Lamar High School in Arlington, Texas, and the University of Texas in Austin, Texas, where he received a communications degree and was one of only twenty students in the film department's intensive Production Sequence.

Career 
After graduating from college, Miller moved out to Los Angeles where he began working in the mail room of Industry Entertainment. His first break into acting came after he signed on with the Wilhelmina modeling agency. He appeared in six commercials, including two for Electronic Arts' The Sims. He also did commercials for JCPenney, Pizza Hut and pokerparty.com.

At the age of 24, Miller screen-tested for the CBS Daytime soap opera As the World Turns, but due to bad management, he lost the audition, and subsequently the management and agency. He took a two-year hiatus from acting after that experience.

In 2006, Miller returned to acting, starring in an episode of CSI: NY. A year later, he landed the role of Richie Novak, the murdering and blackmailing brother of Annie Lavery on the ABC Daytime soap opera All My Children. His first appearance was August 30, 2007. When news of the character's demise broke in August 2008, Miller began the audition process again. Barbara Bloom (Senior Vice President, Daytime, CBS Entertainment), Julie Hanan Carruthers (Executive Producer, All My Children), Marla Kanelos (former Script Writer, All My Children, now Associate Head Writer, The Young and the Restless), and screen-test partners Peter Bergman and Elizabeth Hendrickson were instrumental in helping him get the job at The Young and the Restless.

Miller's last appearance as Richie Novak on All My Children coincided with his first appearance as Billy Abbott on The Young and the Restless on September 19, 2008. He became the fourth contract actor to fill the role, a role that had been met with varying degrees of success in its three previous attempts to recast the part. Miller, who submitted the longest Emmy reel among all nominated performers (over 32 minutes long—an entire episode), was awarded for his work in an It's A Wonderful Life-styled episode of The Young and the Restless with his first nomination and win as Outstanding Supporting Actor in a Drama Series on June 27, 2010 as well as June 14, 2013.

In 2011, he was nominated a second time in the Outstanding Supporting Actor category for the same role. Miller also appears, as himself, in an independent film titled Remembering Nigel, which premiered at the Paso Robles Digital Film Festival on November 25, 2009.

In August 2012, it was confirmed that Miller would be appearing in primetime as a recurring cast member on the CW Network’s thriller Ringer. Miller was also cast as Gabe Watson in the Lifetime made-for-TV movie Fatal Honeymoon.

On September 2, 2014, General Hospital executive producer Frank Valentini announced on Twitter that Miller would join the cast as Jason Morgan. In March 2018, for his portrayal of Jason, Miller earned a nomination for Outstanding Lead Actor. In 2017, with the return of Steve Burton to the role of Jason, Miller's casting was retconned to that of his twin, Drew Cain. In July 2019, Miller announced his exit from the soap.

Filmography

Awards and nominations

References

External links

Lamar High School (Arlington, Texas) Notable Alumni

1979 births
Living people
American male soap opera actors
Daytime Emmy Award winners
Daytime Emmy Award for Outstanding Lead Actor in a Drama Series winners
Daytime Emmy Award for Outstanding Supporting Actor in a Drama Series winners
Male actors from Texas
Lamar High School (Arlington, Texas) alumni
People from Arlington, Texas
People from Grand Prairie, Texas
Male actors from Tulsa, Oklahoma